Ternate, officially the Municipality of Ternate, is a 4th class municipality in the province of Cavite, Philippines. According to the 2020 census, it has a population of 24,653 people.

Formerly known as Bahra, the municipality is named after Ternate island of Indonesia where migrants from then Dutch East Indies originated.

History
The Merdicas (also spelled Mardicas or Mardikas) were Catholic natives of the islands of Ternate and Tidore of the Moluccas, converted during the Portuguese occupation of the islands by Jesuit missionaries. The islands were later captured by the Spanish who vied for their control with the Dutch. In 1663, the Spanish garrison in Ternate were forced to pull out to defend Manila against an impending invasion by Koxinga (sacrificing the Moluccas to the Dutch in doing so) from the Kingdom of Tungning in Taiwan. Two hundred families of Merdicas volunteered to help, eventually being resettled in a sandbar near the mouth of the Maragondon river (known as the Bahra de Maragondon) and Tanza, Cavite. The Ternatean community in Ternate, Cavite was preluded by the deportation of the Ternate ruler, Sultan Said Din Burkat, who was sent to Luzon and converted to Christianity.

The invasion did not occur as Koxinga fell ill and died. The Merdicas community eventually integrated into the local population. Today, the place is called Ternate after the island of Ternate in the Moluccas, and the descendants of the Merdicas continue to use their Spanish creole (with Portuguese and Papuan influence) which came to be known as Ternateño Chabacano.

Ternate was once a mere barrio of Maragondon. Ternate was the first town to attain full independence from Maragondon on March 31, 1857, under an agreement signed by Tomas de Leon, Felix Nigosa, Pablo de Leon, Florencio Nino Franco and Juan Ramos in behalf of the people of Ternate.

On March 3, 1992, Mayor Octavio Velasco, his two bodyguards and the town chief of police Felipe Enero were assassinated in front of the Ternate Municipal Hall by unknown gunmen, alleged to be five bodyguards of then-Cavite Representative Jorge Nuñez. By March 1994, the assassins had yet to be caught by authorities.

Geography

Barangays
Ternate is politically subdivided into ten barangays (three urban and seven rural).

Climate

Demographics

Language
In addition to Tagalog, the community continue to use one of several Spanish-based creole varieties found in the Philippines, collectively known as Chabacano (Ternateño Chavacano); Locals however call this vernacular simply as Bahra.

Religion
Most Ternateños are Christian, with the majority belonging to the Catholic Church, and the rest subscribing to independent or evangelical Christian denominations. A number of residents profess Islam, belonging to the Sunni branch predominant throughout the country.
Catholicism
Philippine Independent Church (Aglipayan Church)
Iglesia Ni Cristo
United Church of Christ in the Philippines
Jehovah's Witnesses
The Church of Jesus Christ of Latter-day Saints
Assemblies of God
Church of Alpha Omega Christian Ministries Inc.
Islam

Economy

Government

Elected officials
The following are the elected officials of the town elected last May 09, 2022 which serves until 2025:

References

External links

[ Philippine Standard Geographic Code]
Philippine Census Information

1663 establishments in the Spanish Empire
Municipalities of Cavite
Populated places on Manila Bay